In law, a reasonable person, reasonable man, or the man on the Clapham omnibus, is a hypothetical person of legal fiction crafted by the courts and communicated through case law and jury instructions.

Strictly according to the fiction, it is misconceived for a party to seek evidence from actual people to establish how the reasonable man would have acted or what he would have foreseen. This person's character and care conduct under any common set of facts, is decided through reasoning of good practice or policy—or "learned" permitting there is a compelling consensus of public opinion—by high courts.

In some practices, for circumstances arising from an uncommon set of facts, this person is seen to represent a composite of a relevant community's judgement as to how a typical member of said community should behave in situations that might pose a threat of harm (through action or inaction) to the public. However, cases resulting in judgment notwithstanding verdict can be examples where a vetted jury's composite judgment was deemed beyond that of the reasonable person, and thus overruled.

The reasonable person belongs to a family of hypothetical figures in law including: the "right-thinking member of society", the "officious bystander", the "reasonable parent", the "reasonable landlord", the "fair-minded and informed observer", the "person having ordinary skill in the art" in patent law, and stretching back to Roman jurists, the figure of the bonus pater familias, all used to define legal standards.  While there is a loose consensus in black letter law, there is no accepted technical definition.  As with legal fiction in general, it is somewhat susceptible to ad hoc manipulation or transformation, and hence the "reasonable person" is an emergent concept of common law. The "reasonable person" is used as a tool to standardize, teach law students, or explain the law to a jury.

As a legal fiction, the "reasonable person" is not an average person or a typical person, leading to great difficulties in applying the concept in some criminal cases, especially in regard to the partial defence of provocation. The standard also holds that each person owes a duty to behave as a reasonable person would under the same or similar circumstances. While the specific circumstances of each case will require varying kinds of conduct and degrees of care, the reasonable person standard undergoes no variation itself. The "reasonable person" construct can be found applied in many areas of the law.  The standard performs a crucial role in determining negligence in both criminal law—that is, criminal negligence—and tort law.

The standard is also used in contract law, to determine contractual intent, or (when there is a duty of care) whether there has been a breach of the standard of care. The intent of a party can be determined by examining the understanding of a reasonable person, after consideration is given to all relevant circumstances of the case including the negotiations, any practices the parties have established between themselves, usages and any subsequent conduct of the parties.

The standard does not exist independently of other circumstances within a case that could affect an individual's judgement.

History
The "reasonable man" appeared in Richard Hooker's defence of conservatism in religion, the Laws of Ecclesiastical Polity (1594-7), where he preferred Papists to Turks and accepted the opinions of religious experts when there was no reason to dissent.

In 1835, Adolphe Quetelet detailed the characteristics of l'homme moyen (French, "average man"). His work is translated into English several ways. As a result, some authors pick "average man", "common man", "reasonable man", or stick to the original "l'homme moyen".  Quetelet was a Belgian astronomer, mathematician, statistician and sociologist. He documented the physical characteristics of man on a statistical basis and discussed man's motivations when acting in society.

Two years later, the "reasonable person" made his first appearance in the English case of Vaughan v. Menlove (1837). In Menlove, the defendant had stacked hay on his rental property in a manner prone to spontaneous ignition. After he had been repeatedly warned over the course of five weeks, the hay ignited and burned the defendant's barns and stable and then spread to the landlord's two cottages on the adjacent property. Menlove's attorney admitted his client's "misfortune of not possessing the highest order of intelligence," arguing that negligence should only be found if the jury decided Menlove had not acted with "bona fide [and] to the best of his [own] judgment."

The Menlove court disagreed, reasoning that such a standard would be too subjective, instead preferring to set an objective standard for adjudicating cases:

English courts upheld the standard again nearly 20 years later in Blyth v. Company Proprietors of the Birmingham Water Works, holding:

Rationale
American jurist Oliver Wendell Holmes, Jr. explained the theory behind the reasonable person standard as stemming from the impossibility of "measuring a man's powers and limitations." Individual, personal quirks inadvertently injuring the persons or property of others are no less damaging than intentional acts. For society to function, "a certain average of conduct, a sacrifice of individual peculiarities going beyond a certain point, is necessary to the general welfare." Thus, a reasonable application of the law is sought, compatible with planning, working, or getting along with others. As such, "his neighbors accordingly require him, at his proper peril, to come up to their standard, and the courts which they establish decline to take his personal equation into account." He heralded the reasonable person as a legal fiction whose care conduct under any common set of facts, is chosen—or "learned" permitting there is a compelling consensus of public opinion—by the courts.

The reasonable person standard is by no means democratic in its scope; it is, contrary to popular conception, intentionally distinct from that of the "average person," who is not necessarily guaranteed to always be reasonable. The reasonable person will weigh all of the following factors before acting:
 the foreseeable risk of harm his actions create versus the utility of his actions;
 the extent of the risk so created;
 the likelihood such risk will actually cause harm to others;
 any alternatives of lesser risk, and the costs of those alternatives.
Taking such actions requires the reasonable person to be appropriately informed, capable, aware of the law, and fair-minded. Such a person might do something extraordinary in certain circumstances, but whatever that person does or thinks, it is always reasonable.

The reasonable person has been called an "excellent but odious character."

English legal scholar Percy Henry Winfield summarized much of the literature by observing that:

Hand Rule

Under United States common law, a well known—though nonbinding—test for determining how a reasonable person might weigh the criteria listed above was set down in United States v. Carroll Towing Co. in 1947 by the Chief Judge of the U.S. Court of Appeals for the Second Circuit, Learned Hand. The case concerned a barge that had broken her mooring with the dock. Writing for the court, Hand said:

While the test offered by Hand does not encompass all the criteria available above, juries in a negligence case might well still be instructed to take the other factors into consideration in determining whether the defendant was negligent.

The Sedona Conference issued its Commentary on a Reasonable Security Test to advance the Hand Rule for a cybersecurity context. The commentary adds three important articulations to the Hand Rule; a person is reasonable if no alternative safeguard would have provided an added benefit that was greater than the added burden, the utility of the risk should be considered as a factor in the calculation (as either a cost or a benefit, depending on the situation), and both qualitative and quantitative factors may be used in the test.

Personal circumstances
The legal fiction of the reasonable person is an ideal, as nobody is perfect. Everyone has limitations , so the standard requires only that people act similarly to how "a reasonable person under the circumstances" would, as if their limitations were themselves circumstances.  As such, courts require that the reasonable person be viewed as having the same limitations as the defendant.

For example, a disabled defendant is held to a standard that, by necessity, represents how a reasonable person with that same disability would act. This is no excuse for poor judgment, or trying to act beyond one's abilities. Were it so, there would be as many standards as there were defendants; and courts would spend innumerable hours,  and the parties much more money, on determining that particular defendant's . 

By using the reasonable person standard, courts instead use an objective tool  and avoid such subjective evaluations.    when attempting to determine liability.

Children
One broad allowance made to the reasonable person standard is for children. The standard here requires that a child act in a similar manner to how a "reasonable person of like age, intelligence, and experience under like circumstances" would act. In many common law systems, children under the age of 6 or 7 are typically exempt from any liability, whether civil or criminal, as they are deemed to be unable to understand the risk involved in their actions. This is called the defense of infancy: in Latin, doli incapax.
In some jurisdictions, one of the exceptions to these allowances concern children engaged in what is primarily considered to be high-risk adult activity, such as operating a motor vehicle, and in some jurisdictions, children can also be "tried as an adult" for serious crimes, such as murder, which causes the court to disregard the defendant's age.

Mentally ill
The reasonable person standard makes no allowance for the mentally ill. Such a refusal goes back to the standard set in Menlove, where Menlove's attorney argued for the subjective standard. In the 170 years since, the law has kept to the legal judgment of having only the single, objective standard. Such judicial adherence sends a message that the mentally ill would do better to refrain from taking risk-creating actions, unless they exercise a heightened degree of self-restraint and precaution, if they intend to avoid liability.

Generally, the courts have reasoned that by not accepting mental illness as a bar to recovery, a potentially liable third party, such as a caregiver, will be more likely to protect the public. The courts have also stated the reason that members of the public are unable to identify a mentally ill person, as they can a child or someone with a physical disability.

Professionals
When a person attempts a skilful act, the "reasonable person under the circumstances" test is elevated to a standard of whether the person acted how a "reasonable professional under the circumstances" would have, whether or not that person is actually a professional, has training, or has experience. Other factors also become relevant, such as the degree to which a professional is educated (i.e., whether a specialist within the specific field, or just a general practitioner of the trade), and customary practices and general procedures of similar professionals. However, such other relevant factors are never dispositive.

Some professions may maintain a custom or practice long after a better method has become available. The new practices, though less risky, may be entirely ignored. In such cases, the practitioner may very well have acted unreasonably despite following custom or general practices.

Medical professionals
In healthcare, plaintiffs must prove via expert testimony the standard of medical care owed and a departure from that standard. The only exception to the requirement of expert testimony is where the departure from accepted medical practices was so egregious that a layperson can readily recognize the departure.

However, controversial medical practices can be deemed reasonable when followed by a respected and reputable minority of the medical field, or where the medical profession cannot agree over which practices are best.

Armed professionals
The "reasonable officer" standard is a method often applied to law enforcement and other armed professions to help determine if a use of force was excessive. The test is whether an appropriately trained professional, knowing what the officer knew at the time and following guidelines (such as a force continuum), would have used the same level of force or higher. If the level of force is justified, the quantity of force is usually presumed to have been necessary unless there are other factors. For example, if a trained police officer was justified in fatally shooting a suspect, the number of shots is presumed to have been necessary barring other factors, such as a reckless disregard of others' safety or that additional force was used when the suspect was no longer a threat.

Inexperience
When anyone undertakes a skilful task that creates a risk to others, that person is held to the minimum standard of how a reasonable person experienced in that task would act, regardless of their actual level of experience.

External circumstances
Factors beyond the defendant's control are always relevant. Additionally, so is the context within which each action is made. Many things affect how a person acts: individual perceptions, knowledge, the weather, etc. The standard of care required depends on the circumstances, but is always that which is reasonable.

While community customs may be relied upon to indicate what kind of action is expected in the circumstances, these are not themselves conclusive of what a reasonable person would do.

It is precisely for this wide-ranging variety of possible facts that the reasonable person standard is so broad (and often confusing and difficult to apply). However, a few general areas of relevant circumstances rise above the others.

Emergency doctrine
Allowing for circumstances under which a person must act urgently is important to prevent hindsight bias by the trier of fact. A reasonable person may not always act as they would when more relaxed. It is fair that actions be judged in light of any exigent conditions that could have affected how the defendant acted.

Available resources
People must make do with what they have or can get. Such circumstances are relevant to any determination of whether the defendant acted reasonably. Where resources are scarce, some actions may be reasonable that would not be were there plenty.

Negligence per se

Because a reasonable person is objectively presumed to know the law, noncompliance with a local safety statute may also constitute negligence. The related doctrine of negligence per se addresses the circumstances under which the law of negligence can become an implied cause of action for breaching a statutory standard of care. Conversely, minimal compliance with a safety statute does not always absolve a defendant if the trier of fact determines that a reasonable person would have taken actions beyond and in excess of what the statute requires. The trier of fact can deem the defendant's duty of care met by finding that the statute's standard itself is reasonable and the defendant acted in accordance with what it statute contemplated.

Reasonable bystander

For common law contracts, disputes over contract formation are subjected to what is known as the objective test of assent in order to determine whether a contract exists. This standard is also known as the officious bystander, reasonable bystander, reasonable third party, or reasonable person in the position of the party. This is in contrast to the subjective test employed in most civil law jurisdictions. The test stems from attempts to balance the competing interests of the judicial policies of assent and of reliability. The former holds that no person ought to be contractually obligated if they did not consent to such an agreement; the latter holds that if no person can rely on actions or words demonstrating consent, then the whole system of commercial exchange will ultimately collapse.

Prior to the 19th century, courts used a test of subjective evaluation; that is, the trier of fact determined each party's understanding. If both parties were of the same mind and understanding on matters, then assent was manifested and the contract was valid. Between the 19th and 20th centuries, the courts shifted toward the objectivist test, reasoning that subjective testimony was often unreliable and self-serving.

From those opposite principles, modern law has found its way to a rough middle ground, though it still shows a strong bias toward the objective test. Promises and agreements are reached through manifestations of consent, and parties are liable for actions that deliberately manifest such consent; however, evidence of either party's state of mind can be used to determine the context of the manifestation if said evidence is reliable and compatible with the manifestation in question, though such evidence is typically given very little weight.

Another circumstance where the reasonable bystander test is used occurs when one party has inadvertently misstated the terms of the contract, and the other party sues to enforce those terms: if it would have been clear to a reasonable bystander that a mistake had been made, then the contract is voidable by the party who made the error; otherwise, the contract is binding.

Reasonable person standard for victims

Reasonable woman

Sexual harassment 
A variant of the reasonable person can be found in sexual harassment law as the reasonable woman standard. The variation recognizes a difference between men and women regarding the effect of unwanted interaction with a sexual tone. As women have historically been more vulnerable to rape and sex-related violence than have men, some courts believe that the proper perspective for evaluating a claim of sexual harassment is that of the reasonable woman. Notably, J. Scalia held that women did not have constitutional protection from discrimination under the fourteenth amendment equal protection clause, where by extension of logic, held the "reasonable woman" standard to be of moot value. However, such has not been the majority opinion of the court.

Satire
Though the use of the reasonable woman standard has gained traction in some areas of the law, the standard has not escaped the crosshairs of humorists. In 1924, legal humorist A. P. Herbert considered the concept of the reasonable man at length in the fictional case of "Fardell v. Potts." In Herbert's fictional account, the judge addressed the lack of a reasonable woman standard in the common law, and ultimately concluded that "a reasonable woman does not exist."

L'homme moyen sensuel
The concept of l'homme moyen sensuel does not speak of a reasonable person's ability, actions, or understandings.  Rather it refers to the response of a reasonable person when presented with some form of information either by image or sound, or upon reading a book or magazine. A well-known application of the concept is Judge John M. Woolsey's lifting of the ban on the book Ulysses by James Joyce. That ruling contemplated the effect the book would have upon a reasonable person of reasonable sensibility.  Similarly, when the publisher of Howl and Other Poems was charged in California with publishing an obscene book, the concept of l'homme moyen sensuel influenced the court's finding of innocence. It was nearly two decades after Woolsey that the US Supreme Court set down the standard by which materials, when viewed by l'homme moyen sensuel, were judged either obscene or not. Generally, it has been l'homme moyen sensuel that has dictated what is and is not obscene or pornographic in books, movies, pictures, and now the Internet for at least the past 100 years.

Qualifications
Very often, for instance, in the case of noise ordinances, the enforcement of the law is only for the purpose of protecting the right of a "reasonable person of normal sensitivity".

See also 

Objective historian
 Bonus pater familias
 Casuistry
 Subjective and objective standard of reasonableness
 Reasonable doubt
 Reasonable suspicion
 Standard of care in English law

References

Notes

Sources 
 
 
 
 
 Miller, Alan & Perry, Ronen, The Reasonable Person, New York University Law Review
 
 
 

Common law
Criminal law
Tort law
Law of negligence
English legal terminology
Scots law
American legal terminology
Elements of crime
Forensic psychology
Legal fictions
Legal doctrines and principles
Sexual harassment in the United States
Legal reasoning